Delta-sarcoglycan is a protein that in humans is encoded by the SGCD gene.

Function 
The protein encoded by this gene is one of the four known components of the sarcoglycan complex, which is a subcomplex of the dystrophin-glycoprotein complex (DGC). DGC forms a link between the F-actin cytoskeleton and the extracellular matrix. This protein is expressed most abundantly in skeletal and cardiac muscle. The mutations in this gene have been associated with autosomal recessive limb-girdle muscular dystrophy and dilated cardiomyopathy. Alternatively spliced transcript variants encoding distinct isoforms have been observed.

In melanocytic cells SGCD gene expression may be regulated by MITF.

Interactions 
SGCD has been shown to interact with FLNC.

References

Further reading

External links 
 LOVD mutation database: SGCD

Human proteins